Shinnston Historic District is a national historic district located at Shinnston, Harrison County, West Virginia.  The district encompasses 143 contributing buildings in the central business district and surrounding residential areas of Shinnston. The major influence on the town's development was the arrival of the Baltimore and Ohio Railroad in 1890.  Notable buildings include the Frank Abruzzino House (1922), Aaron Shinn House (c. 1821), I.O.O.F. Lodge building (1906), Dr. Emory Strickler or Wilma Watkins House (c. 1875), Guarascio or Ashby Apartments (c. 1910), and the First National Bank of Shinnston.  The district includes notable examples of popular 19th- and early 20th-century architectural styles including Gothic Revival, Italianate, and Shingle Style.

It was listed on the National Register of Historic Places in 1998.

References

National Register of Historic Places in Harrison County, West Virginia
Commercial buildings on the National Register of Historic Places in West Virginia
Houses on the National Register of Historic Places in West Virginia
Historic districts in Harrison County, West Virginia
Shingle Style architecture in West Virginia
Gothic Revival architecture in West Virginia
Italianate architecture in West Virginia
Houses in Harrison County, West Virginia
Historic districts on the National Register of Historic Places in West Virginia